William Mountford Williamson (1887 – 2 August 1918) was an English footballer who played in the Football League for Leicester Fosse and Stoke as an outside right.

Career
Williamson began his career at local amateur club North Staffs Normads, before joining First Division club Stoke in 1906. He made just 8 appearances during two years at the Victoria Ground and transferred to Birmingham & District League club Crewe Alexandra in 1910, with whom he spent a further two years. Williamson re-entered League football with Leicester Fosse in 1910, but made just two appearances. He re-joined Stoke in 1911, but failed to gain a place in the first team and left to join Wellington Town.

Personal life 
Prior to the First World War, Williamson enlisted in the Gordon Highlanders. He was in Egypt with his battalion when the war broke out in August 1914 and after a brief spell back in the UK, the battalion was deployed on the Western Front two months later. Williamson saw action at the First Battle of Ypres and was wounded in the left hand, left knee and taken prisoner of war by Germany. He died of Spanish flu at Hamelin prisoner of war camp on 2 August 1918 and is commemorated on the Cologne Memorial.

Career statistics

References

English footballers
Stoke City F.C. players
Leicester City F.C. players
Crewe Alexandra F.C. players
English Football League players
Telford United F.C. players
1887 births
1918 deaths
British Army personnel of World War I
British military personnel killed in World War I
Gordon Highlanders soldiers
World War I prisoners of war held by Germany
Association football outside forwards
Deaths from Spanish flu
British World War I prisoners of war
Military personnel from Staffordshire